Tumble Leaf is an American animated series that premiered in 2014 on Amazon Prime Video. It is a stop motion animated series for preschool-aged children and is based on the short film Miro.  Created by animator Drew Hodges (Saturday Night Live, Community) and stop-motion studio Bix Pix Entertainment, Tumble Leaf features an anthropomorphic blue fox named Fig and his caterpillar friend Stick (both voiced by child actor Christopher Downs), along with other residents of the island of Tumble Leaf, helping preschoolers learn basic science lessons through playful examples. Additional regular characters include Maple (Brooke Wolloff), Hedge (Zak McDowell), Pine (Addie Zintel), Ginkgo (Alex Trugman), Rutabaga (Jodi Downs), Zucchini (Alan Franzenburg), and Butternut & Squash (Emily Downs). Each episode consists of two 11-minute stories with Fig learning the mechanics of various items discovered in a special room on board the abandoned shipwreck where he resides.

The show was part of the first round of television pilots ordered by Amazon in 2013 for its Amazon Video service, and was officially picked up for its first 13-episode season on May 29, 2013. The show's first six episodes premiered exclusively on the Amazon Video service on May 23, 2014, and the remaining seven episodes of season one premiered on September 5, 2014. A re-dubbed German version premiered for Amazon's German Prime customers on August 20, 2014.

On February 23, 2015 it was renewed for a second season, which became available on December 10, 2015.

On December 21, 2015 it was renewed for a third season. It premiered on April 4, 2017 with an Easter special.  The remainder of season three premiered on August 14, 2017.

Season 4 premiered on July 23, 2018. A Halloween special was released on October 19, 2018. The remainder of season four premiered on February 25, 2019. The show was nominated for a Peabody Award.

The series ended after the fourth season.

Episodes

Season 1

Season 2

Season 3

Season 4

Awards and nominations

References

External links
 
 

Amazon Prime Video original programming
Animated television series by Amazon Studios
2010s American animated television series
2010s American children's television series
2014 American television series debuts
2019 American television series endings
American children's animated adventure television series
American children's animated fantasy television series
Annie Award winners
Animated television series about foxes
American preschool education television series
English-language television shows
American stop-motion animated television series
Amazon Prime Video children's programming
Television series by Amazon Studios
Animated preschool education television series
2010s preschool education television series